Josete may refer to:

People
 (born 1970), Spanish footballer
 (born 1980), Spanish footballer
José Antonio Malagón Rubio (born 1988), Spanish footballer
José Antonio Miranda Boacho (born 1998), Equatoguinean footballer